Bégin is a municipality in Quebec, Canada. It is named after Louis-Nazaire Bégin, and was first settled by families from Tadoussac around 1915.

See also
 List of municipalities in Quebec

References

Municipalities in Quebec
Incorporated places in Saguenay–Lac-Saint-Jean